David Smith Bennett (May 3, 1811 – November 6, 1894) was an American politician and a U.S. Representative from New York.

Biography
Born on a farm near Camillus, New York, Bennett was the son of James B. and Sarah Olmstead Bennett and attended the common schools and the local academy in Onondaga. He married Harriet Amanda Benham.

Career
Bennett engaged in agricultural pursuits and later moved to Syracuse. From there he extended his business to New York City. In 1853, Bennett moved to Buffalo, where he built and operated several grain elevators.

A member of the New York State Senate, Bennett was State Senator for the (31st District) in the 89th New York State Legislature in 1866 and the 90th New York State Legislature in 1867.

As a Republican, Bennett was elected to the forty-first United States Congress, as a U. S. Representative for the thirtieth district of New York, holding office from March 4, 1869, to March 3, 1871.

After declining to run for renomination in 1870, Bennett resumed his former business pursuits in Buffalo, New York.

Death
Bennett died in Buffalo, Erie County, New York, on November 6, 1894 (age 83 years, 187 days). He is interred at Oakwood Cemetery, Syracuse, New York.

References

External links

1811 births
1894 deaths
Politicians from Buffalo, New York
Republican Party New York (state) state senators
Republican Party members of the United States House of Representatives from New York (state)
People from Camillus, New York
19th-century American politicians
Burials at Oakwood Cemetery (Syracuse, New York)